The Czech football champions indicates all past winners of the top-tier football leagues in which clubs from Czech Republic were inserted in.  It includes the Czechoslovak First League and current Czech First League.

History
Bohemia was an early adopter of football. In the Czech Republic, football originated in Bohemia in early 1890s. The most famous clubs, Sparta and Slavia, were both founded in 1893. 

The first Czech championship, won by CFK Kickers Prague (spring) and Deutscher FC Prag (autumn) was disputed. In 1897 the Czech Crown championship was won, won by Slavia and in 1902 the Czech Football Association championship won by the Cesky AFC Vinohrady. Czechoslovak First League  was the premier football league in the Czechoslovakia from 1925 to 1993.

Champions

Mistrovství Čech a Moravy (1896–1902)

Mistrovství ČSF / Mistrovství Čech (1909–1917)

Mistrovství ČSF / Středočeská župa (1918–1924)

Czechoslovak First League (1925–1992)

Czech First League (1993–present)

Performance by club

Czechoslovak First League (1925–1992)

Czech First League (1993–present)

Overall (1925–present) 
 Slovak clubs are no longer eligible for the championship as they play in their own league.

See also
 Football in Czechoslovakia
 Football in the Czech Republic
 Czechoslovak First League
 Czech First League

References

champions
champions
Czech
Czechoslovak First League